The Metsimaholo Local Municipality council consists of forty-six members elected by mixed-member proportional representation. Twenty-three councillors are elected by first-past-the-post voting in twenty-three wards, while the remaining twenty-three are chosen from party lists so that the total number of party representatives is proportional to the number of votes received.

In the election of 1 November 2021, no party won a majority on the council. The Economic Freedom Fighters (EFF) formed a coalition with the African National Congress (ANC). The EFF's Selloane Motjeane was elected mayor, while Lucas Fisher of the ANC was elected Speaker and Fikile Msokweni of the ANC the Council Whip. Shortly after, the EFF ordered the mayor to stand down, as the party rejected working with the ANC.

Results 
The following table shows the composition of the council after past elections.

December 2000 election

The following table shows the results of the 2000 election.

March 2006 election

The following table shows the results of the 2006 election.

May 2011 election

The following table shows the results of the 2011 election.

August 2016 election

The following table shows the results of the 2016 election.

November 2021 election

The following table shows the results of the 2021 election.

References

Metsimaholo
Elections in the Free State
elections